Radenko (Cyrillic script: Раденко) is a South Slavic masculine given name or East Slavic surname. It may refer to:

Radenko Dobraš (born 1968), Serbian basketball player
Radenko Kamberović (born 1983), Serbian footballer
Radenko Kneževič (born 1979), footballer
Radenko Pilčević (born 1986), Serbian basketball player
Radenko Stanković (1880–1956), Serbian cardiologist and politician
Anatoliy Radenko (born 1959), Ukrainian footballer

See also
Radenkovac, village in Sokobanja municipality, Serbia
Radenković, village in Sremska Mitrovica municipality, Serbia

Slavic masculine given names
Serbian masculine given names